{|
{{Infobox ship image
| Ship image   = 
| Ship caption = USS Olympia (C-6)
}}

|}

The Olympia class' was a class of protected cruiser operated by the United States Navy.

History
The Olympia class was built in a transitional period for warship design and for the US Navy. The Navy was expanding its fleet to move beyond coastal defence onto the world stage. The Olympia was larger and faster than the previous generation of Navy ships, built with a new type of vertical triple expansion steam engine. Yet she retained a vestigial suit of sails for emergency propulsion. She was one of the first navy ships to have electricity, hydraulic powered steering gear and refrigeration. The Olympia class was also designed and constructed entirely inside the United States as per a stipulation by Congress. This was to force advances in United States industrial technology. This led to the rise of steel shipbuilding inside the United States.

The Olympia'' has the distinction of being the third oldest preserved United States Navy ship, after the USS Constitution and the USS Constellation and the only surviving ship of the Spanish–American War.

List of ships

External links
Friends of the Cruiser Olympia 
Global Security.org - Olympia class cruiser
Global Security.org - Olympia class cruiser specifications

Cruiser classes
Cruisers of the United States Navy